Robert Westerholt (born 2 January 1975) is a Dutch musician, known as the guitarist and co-founder of the symphonic metal band Within Temptation. He also writes music for the band along with his partner and band vocalist Sharon den Adel. He used to work in human resource management before his career with Within Temptation.

Work prior to Within Temptation 
Westerholt was born in Waddinxveen, South Holland, Netherlands. In 1992, Westerholt formed the band "The Circle" with future Within Temptation keyboard player Martijn Spierenburg, and he began writing his own music. The Circle's first demo, entitled 'Symphony No.1' was finished in December 1992. At this point, The Circle had a complete line-up, composed of Westerholt, Martijn, Jeroen van Veen (Within Temptation's bassist), Arjan Groenedijk and Ernst van der Loo, although Arjan and Ernst both left the band a while later. In a 1995 compilation album released by DSFA Records, two songs, "Broken Silence" and "Frozen" by The Circle, were featured. Soon afterward, Westerholt left The Circle, and the band was renamed as Voyage. Voyage released their only album 'Embrace' in 1995, in which Sharon den Adel collaborated on the track "Frozen".

Within Temptation 
After leaving The Circle, Westerholt began writing more music for a new musical project with his girlfriend, Sharon den Adel. Westerholt sent demo versions of their songs 'Enter' and 'Candles' to former Voyage bandmate Jeroen van Veen, who then left Voyage to join Westerholt's project, along with Michiel Papenhove.  Their first drummer was Richard Willemse, who left and was replaced with Dennis Leeflang, with whom Within Temptation recorded their first demo. He left soon afterward and was replaced with Ivar de Graaf. Westerholt recalls that "we always had a little bit of a drummer problem, leaving and coming back again...". By 1997, their line-up had been completed, with Sharon (vocals), Westerholt (guitars and vocals), Westerholt's brother Martijn (keyboards), Jeroen (bass), Michiel (guitar) and Ivar (drums).
In the same year, Within Temptation were signed to DSFA Records and released their debut album, Enter.

As of 2011, Westerholt has stepped down from touring with Within Temptation in order to take care of his and Den Adel's children. He is still a recording band member, however, and will focus on songwriting and production. Stefan Helleblad, who has been working behind the scenes with the band, is his live stand-in.

Other appearances 
In 1998, he had a small singing part as Death (along with George Oosthoek of Orphanage) on the Ayreon rock opera "Into the Electric Castle", on which Sharon den Adel played one of the main characters.

Personal life 
Westerholt and Sharon den Adel became parents to Eva Luna on 7 December 2005 and Robin Aiden on 1 June 2009. The birth of their son, Logan Arwin, was announced on 31 March 2011.

References

External links 
Interview with Robert Westerholt (September 2008 @ Appelpop Festival)

1975 births
Living people
Dutch heavy metal guitarists
Dutch male guitarists
Dutch singer-songwriters
People from Waddinxveen
Within Temptation members